Post Animal is an American psychedelic rock band formed in 2014, originating from Chicago, Illinois. It consists of Dalton Allison (bass/vocals), Jake Hirshland (guitar/keyboard/vocals), Javi Reyes (guitar/vocals), Wesley Toledo (drums/vocals), and Matt Williams (guitar/vocals). As of 2019, Joe Keery was no longer a touring member of the band, and he later parted ways due to acting commitments.  All members share songwriting contributions and sing lead vocals on their respective compositions.

Career
The band has self-released an EP (Post Animal Perform the Most Curious Water Activities) and a singles collection (The Garden Series) and toured with White Reaper, Twin Peaks, Ron Gallo, J. Roddy Walston and the Business, and Wavves.

Post Animal signed to Polyvinyl in 2017 and played Shaky Knees and Bonnaroo in 2018.

The band's debut full-length, When I Think of You in a Castle, was released on April 20, 2018.

Post Animal supported Cage the Elephant in February 2020 on their United Kingdom tour. The band were the supporting act on dates in Leeds, Glasgow, Manchester, Birmingham, and London.

Musical style
The Chicago Tribune has described the band's sound as "if Tame Impala listened to a lot of Black Sabbath and were signed to Elephant 6."

Discography

Albums
When I Think of You in a Castle (2018)
Forward Motion Godyssey (2020)
Love Gibberish (2022)

EPs
Post Animal Perform the Most Curious Water Activities (2015)
The Garden Series (2016)
Worried About You (2020)

Singles
 "Special Moment" (2017)
 "Safe or Not- Extended Mix" (2019)
 "Schedule" (2019)
 "Fitness" (2020)
 "How Do You Feel" (2020)
 "Puppy Dog" (2022)

References

External links
 Post Animal

Musical groups from Chicago
Indie rock musical groups from Illinois
Musical groups established in 2014
Polyvinyl Record Co. artists
2014 establishments in Illinois